Two dollar bill may refer to:

 Australian two-dollar note
 Canadian two-dollar bill
 United States two-dollar bill